Commercial Street is a street downtown Portland, Maine. In 2008, it was named one of the ten best streets in the United States by the American Planning Association. It was built upon old piers in the 1850s. Fill was pushed into Casco Bay to accommodate the growing railroad and warehousing needs of the port's working waterfront. In the 1970s and 1980s, much of the economic activity on the street was hurt and many of the properties on the street were sold off for non-marine development, including the building of condominiums. In 1987, Portland voters, led by local fisherman based on Commercial Street, halted all non-marine development along the street and adjacent docks. Marine development around Commercial Street returned in the 1990s and 2000s (decade) alongside other economic development, including tourism-related industries.

The Maine State Pier, a deepwater marine facility and outdoor music venue, is located at the intersection of Commercial Street and Franklin Street.

Widgery Wharf and Union Wharf, located on the eastern end of Commercial Street, are two of the oldest standing structures in the city, having been completed in the late 18th century.

References

Streets in Portland, Maine
Tourist attractions in Portland, Maine
Port of Portland (Maine)
Redeveloped ports and waterfronts in the United States